Carex fracta is a species of sedge known by the common name fragile sheath sedge. It is native to the western United States from Washington to California, where it grows in moist to dry areas in mountain forests and meadows. This sedge produces dense clumps of stems sometimes exceeding a meter tall. The leaves are attached to the stem with a characteristic thin, membranous sheath. The inflorescence is a dense or loose cluster of light green to gold spikes. Some spikes occur lower on the stem as well. The flowers are covered in light colored scales.

External links
Jepson Manual Treatment
Flora of North America
Photo gallery

fracta
Plants described in 1922